The 2001 Campeonato Paulista de Futebol Profissional da Primeira Divisão - Série A1 was the 100th season of São Paulo's top professional football league. The first stage of the championship was played in a round-robin, with all the teams playing each other once; ties were broken through penalty shootouts, with ties with goals being worth two points for the winner and one for the loser, and goalless ties netting one point for the winner and no points for the loser. the four best-placed teams advanced to the semifinals. Corinthians won the championship by the 24th time. Guarani and Mogi Mirim were relegated, however, their relegations were cancelled as both teams were invited into the Rio-São Paulo league in the following year.

Championship

Semifinals

Finals

References

Campeonato Paulista seasons
Paulista